Cozy mysteries, also referred to as "cozies", are a subgenre of crime fiction in which sex and violence occur off stage, the detective is an amateur sleuth, and the crime and detection take place in a small, socially intimate community. Cozies thus stand in contrast to hardboiled fiction, in which more violence and explicit sexuality are central to the plot. The term "cozy" was first coined in the late 20th century when various writers produced work in an attempt to re-create the Golden Age of Detective Fiction.

Characters
The detectives in such stories are nearly always amateurs, and are frequently women. Village policeman Hamish Macbeth, featured in a series of novels by M. C. Beaton, is a notable exception. These characters are typically well educated, intuitive, and hold jobs that bring them into constant contact with other residents of their community and the surrounding region (e.g., caterer, innkeeper, librarian, teacher, dog trainer, shop owner, reporter). Like other amateur detectives, they typically have a contact on the police force who can give them access to important information about the case at hand, but the contact is typically a spouse, lover, friend, or family member rather than a former colleague. Dismissed by the authorities in general as nosy busybodies, particularly if they are middle-aged or elderly women, the detectives in cozy mysteries are thus left free to eavesdrop, gather clues, and use their native intelligence and intuitive "feel" for the social dynamics of the community to solve the crime.

The murderers in cozies are typically neither psychopaths nor serial killers, and, once unmasked, are usually taken into custody without violence. They are generally members of the community where the murder occurs and able to hide in plain sight, and their motives—greed, jealousy, revenge—are often rooted in events years, or even generations, old. The murderers are typically rational and often highly articulate, enabling them to explain, or elaborate on, their motives after their unmasking.

The supporting characters in cozy mysteries are often very broadly drawn and used as comic relief. The accumulation of such characters in long-running cozy mystery series, such as those of Charlotte MacLeod, frequently creates a stock company of eccentrics, among whom the detective stands out as the most, perhaps only, truly sane person.

One subtle joke in such series is how the main character constantly becomes embroiled in so many high-profile cases, often by accident. A long-running joke about the series Murder, She Wrote was how the main character/detective had to be the actual murderer in every case, because, "No matter where she goes, somebody dies!"

Content
Cozy mysteries do not employ any but the mildest profanity. The murders take place off stage, frequently involving relatively bloodless methods such as poisoning and falls from great heights. The wounds inflicted on the victim are never dwelt on and are seldom used as clues. Sexual activity, even between married characters, is only ever gently implied and never directly addressed, and the subject is frequently avoided altogether.

The cozy mystery usually takes place in a town, village, or other community small (or otherwise insular) enough to make it believable that all the principal characters know, and may well have long-standing social relationships with, each other. The amateur detective is usually a gregarious, well-liked individual who is able to get the community members to talk freely about each other. There is usually at least one very knowledgeable, nosy, yet reliable character in the book who is intimately familiar with the personal history and interrelationships of everyone in the town, and whose ability to fill in the blanks of the puzzle enables the amateur detective to solve the case.

Cozy mystery series frequently have a prominent thematic element introduced by the detective's job, pet or hobby. Diane Mott Davidson's cozies, for example, revolve around cooking, Parnell Hall's around crossword puzzles, and Charlotte MacLeod's "Sarah Kelling" series around art. Other series focus on topics including fishing, golfing, hiking, fashion, antiques, and interior decoration. Cat-lovers are well represented among the ranks of cozy-mystery detectives, notably in the work of Lilian Jackson Braun and Rita Mae Brown; herbalists appear frequently (of whom the best known is Ellis Peters' medieval sleuth Brother Cadfael). There are also cozy mystery series with themes of Christmas, Easter, and other holidays.

While de-emphasis on sex and violence, emphasis on puzzle-solving over suspense, the setting of a small town, and a focus on a hobby or occupation are characteristic elements of cozy mysteries, the boundaries of the subgenre remain vague.

Examples of the genre

Literature
 Nancy Atherton's Aunt Dimity novels feature American Lori Sheppard, who settles in an English village thanks to an inheritance from "Aunt" Dimity (an old friend of her late mother's). Dimity communicates with Lori, via a magical journal, to help solve mysteries involving Lori and her neighbors.
 Lilian Jackson Braun's Cat Who... series began as a more "hardboiled" mystery series in the late 1960s but transformed into cozy mysteries when the author resumed writing them almost 20 years later.
Rita Mae Brown wrote three cozy mystery series:   
 The Foxhunting Mystery Series, set in Virginia, features "Sister Jane" Arnold, a 70-year-old Master of the Fox Hunt.
The Mags & Baxter Mystery Series, set in Nevada, features Mags Rogers, ex-Wall Streeter; Baxter, Mag's wirehaired dachshund; Jeep Reed, Mags' Grandmother Rancher; and King, Jeep's German Shepherd cross. 
The Mrs. Murphy series of animal cozies, set in the Deep South, is "co-authored" with Sneaky Pie Brown, the talking cat whom the main cat character, Mrs. Murphy, is based on.
Sarah Caudwell's Hilary Tamar Series features Professor Hilary Tamar, and a cast of clever and trouble-prone young London barristers.
The Miss Marple character, created by Agatha Christie, appears in 12 novels that have been adapted numerous times for film and television.
Blaize Clement's Dixie Hemingway Mysteries chronicle the adventures of a cop turned pet-sitter in Siesta Key, Florida.
 Cleo Coyle's Coffeehouse Mysteries feature Greenwich Village coffeeshop owner Clare Cosi, who sleuths with help from her coffee-hunting ex-husband and her staff of quirky baristas.
 Carola Dunn's Daisy Dalrymple detective series follows the Honorable Daisy Dalrymple and her "copper" husband DCI Alec Fletcher.  Many of the murders occur in aristocratic country houses Daisy is visiting to write articles about, in her 1920s "modern-woman's" career as a journalist.  The usual cast of best friends and relatives make cameo appearances, as do members of Alec's faithful team of detectives who are always on Daisy's side when Alec is trying to keep her out of the case.
Joanne Fluke's novels about Hannah Swensen, a young baker and amateur sleuth living the fictional town of Lake Eden, Minnesota. The books include recipes for baking. 
Carolyn Jourdan's Out on a Limb concerns a desperate search for a young woman who mysteriously vanished from the Great Smoky Mountains National Park during a gathering of world-famous biologists and botanists. The middle-aged accidental amateur sleuths are a female home health care nurse and a male park ranger.
Frances and Richard Lockridge's Mr. and Mrs. North novels feature an ordinary couple who live in Greenwich Village with their cats Gin, Sherry, and Martini and solve mysteries.

Television
Hetty Wainthropp Investigates is an English drama starring Patricia Routledge as the eponymous elderly pensioner who solves mysteries around her Lancashire neighbourhood.
Murder, She Wrote is an American series starring Angela Lansbury as Jessica Fletcher, a mystery novelist who finds that her work often has parallels with her own life.
Pie in the Sky is a British mystery television series that combines sleuthing and cooking. A police detective and gourmet runs his own restaurant in between solving crimes.
Rosemary & Thyme is a British mystery television series that combines accidental amateur sleuthing and gardening. A few episodes have been adapted and expanded as full-length novels.
Father Brown is a British television series set in the early 1950s, with the title character of the same name by G. K. Chesterton, a priest in a small village who doubles as an amateur detective.
Grantchester is a British television series set in the 1950s in the Cambridgeshire village of Grantchester, with the Anglican vicar Sidney Chambers, and subsequently vicar William Davenport, each of whom develop a sideline in sleuthing with the help of Detective Inspector Geordie Keating, based on The Grantchester Mysteries, written by James Runcie.
Agatha Raisin is a British television series with the title character of the same name by M. C. Beaton, a frustrated, yet endearing, middle-aged public-relations agent who moved from London to Carsely in the Cotswolds when she sold her public-relations firm in Mayfair and took early retirement, but sets up her own detective agency to solves crimes and murders.
Partners in Crime is a British television series set in the 1950s, and the era of the Cold War against Stalin, with an everyday family doing their everyday jobs while solving crimes at the same time, based on two Partners in Crime stories, The Secret Adversary and N or M? by Agatha Christie.

See also
 Cosy catastrophe

References

Further reading

Crime fiction
Literary genres
Mystery fiction
1980s in television
1990s in television
2000s in television
2010s in television
2020s in television